Paris Métropole Futsal Club is a futsal club based in Paris, France. The club was founded in 2001, played in the Championnat de France de Futsal.

Honours

 2009 Champion de France
 2007 Coupe Nationale de Futsal

Externan link
Official Website

Futsal clubs in France
Futsal clubs established in 2001
2001 establishments in France